Farzia Fallah (born 1980 in Tehran) is a composer. Since 2003 she has been living in Germany, and is currently based in Cologne.

Biography

Education
Fallah studied Electronics and Signal Processing at the Sharif University of Technology from 1998–2003, while simultaneously studying with Alireza Mashayekhi and Farimah Ghavamsadri.

From 2007–2014 Fallah studied composition at the University of the Arts Bremen, first with Younghi Pagh-Paan and later with Jörg Birkenkötter. She also studied electroacoustic composition with Kilian Schwoon and Joachim Heintz. From 2014–2016 she studied at the University of Music and Dance Cologne, taking composition lessons with Johannes Schöllhorn.

Career
Her 2016 work, in sechs Richtungen for accordion and tape, features the tanbur playing of Mehdi Jalali. The piece is based on a poem by Mawlana Rumi, in which he searches for his home "in six directions", and not only from a certain place. The tambur is abstracted on the tape part, and attempts a unity of the two instruments despite the different means of sound production. The piece was written for Margit Kern, but has also been performed by Eva Zöllner.

In 2017, she wrote tänzerisch an der Kante, which was written for Ensemble Musikfabrik and her 2015 work for solo alto flute, Posht-e Hichestan, has been performed by the ensemble's flautist, Helen Bledsoe.

In 2017, her work was performed at the launch concert of the Iranian Female Composers Association, founded by Niloufar Nourbakhsh. In the same year, she was also commissioned to write a work for accordion and shawm, for Duo Mixtura (Katharina Bäuml and Margit Kern), which received its premiere at the Acht Brücken Festival.

List of works 

 Ein weiterer Augenblick des stehenden Jetzt (2018) - percussion, piano and video
 Ausgedehnter Augenblick (2018)  - accordion, bass clarinet, cello and video
 Im selben Augenblick (2017/18) - saxophone, bass clarinet, trombone, percussion, harp and contrabass
 The expanded moments (2017/18) - accordion, bass clarinet
 Tänzerisch an der Kante (2017) - ensemble
 Tänzerisch bis zur Kante (2017) - ensemble
 Ecco la primavera (2017) - accordion and shawm
 Lalayi II (2017) - for violin, viola and cello
 Atemlos lebendig (2016/17) - double bell horn and viola
 Lalayi (2016/17) - two violas
 In sechs Richtungen (2016) - accordion and tape
 Die dritte Schrift (2015/16) - orchestra
 Posht-e Hichestan (2015) - flute solo
 Ungepaart und geschlossen (2015) - piano, cello and clarinet
 Besorgnis der Sperlinge II (2015) - recorder solo
 Besorgnis der Sperlinge I (2013/14) - recorder and electronics
 Soovashoon (2012/13) - 19 musicians in 3 groups
 Frau Meier, die Amsel (2011) - 7 musicians
 Verwandeltes Lichtgrün (2010/11) - organ and soprano
 Khosha (2010-2014) - for alto and soprano recorder, bass clarinet and bassoon
 … und dann befreit..? (2009/10) - violin
 Lichtabgrund II (2009) 
 Ich und Du, Baum und Regen (2009)
 Lichtabgrund (2008)
 „… Miferestamat“ (2008)
 The ancient Fortress (2007) - cello, baroque harp, piano, and percussion
 Aus Meerrausch und Sonnenglast (2010) - two channel tape

References

External links 
 Official website
 Fazia Fallah on Soundcloud

1980 births
Living people
Iranian composers
Musicians from Tehran
 Farzia Fallah, "The Expanded Moment of Being" in Brooklyn Rail (New York) (September 2021): https://brooklynrail.org/2021/09/criticspage/The-Expanded-Moment-of-Being